Cheikh Ahmet Tidian Niasse (born 19 January 2000) is a Senegalese professional footballer who plays as a defensive midfielder for Swiss side Young Boys.

Career
On 24 January 2019, Niasse signed a professional contract with Lille OSC for three years. Niasse made his professional debut for Lille in a 3–0 Ligue 1 win over AS Saint-Étienne on 28 August 2019.

On 10 December 2020, he made his debut in the UEFA Europa League in a group match against Celtic.

On 1 February 2021, Niasse moved to Greek club Panathinaikos, on a loan deal until the end of the season.

On 3 February 2022, Niasse signed a contract with Young Boys in Switzerland until June 2026.

References

External links
 
 
 

2000 births
Living people
People from Fatick Region
Association football midfielders
Senegalese footballers
Ligue 1 players
Championnat National 2 players
Championnat National 3 players
Super League Greece players
Lille OSC players
Panathinaikos F.C. players
BSC Young Boys players
Senegalese expatriate footballers
Senegalese expatriate sportspeople in France
Expatriate footballers in France
Senegalese expatriate sportspeople in Greece
Expatriate footballers in Greece
Senegalese expatriate sportspeople in Switzerland
Expatriate footballers in Switzerland